Juan José Medina Lamela Was the 19th Puerto Rico Adjutant General, and the commanding officer of the Puerto Rico National Guard. Medina was born in Quebradillas, Puerto Rico, was a Boy Scout of the troop 92 of Quebradillas and held the rank of brigadier general.

His military education includes the Academy of military sciences at McGhee Tyson Air National Guard Base in Tennessee; the squadron officers school at Maxwell Air Force Base in Alabama; the air command and State College, correspondence; and the Inter-American Defense College in Fort McNair in Washington, D.C. Medina Lamela retired from the Air National Guard on 2012 as a Coronel..

Medina came out of retirement when Puerto Rico governor Alejandro García Padilla appointed him as the Puerto Rico National Guard Adjutant General and was promoted to the rank of Brigadier General. Stepped down as Puerto Rico National Guard Adjutant General in October 2014.

Awards and decorations

Badges

  Weapons Director Badge

See also

List of Puerto Rican military personnel
Puerto Rico Adjutant General

Notes

References

Living people
United States Air Force generals
National Guard (United States) generals
Puerto Rican United States Air Force personnel
Puerto Rico Adjutant Generals
Puerto Rican military officers
People from Quebradillas, Puerto Rico
Puerto Rico National Guard personnel
Recipients of the Humanitarian Service Medal
Recipients of the Meritorious Service Medal (United States)
Year of birth missing (living people)